The I Corps of the Ottoman Empire (Turkish: 1 nci Kolordu or Birinci Kolordu) was one of the corps of the Ottoman Army consisting of ethnic Albanians. It was formed in the early 20th century during Ottoman military reforms

Formation

Order of Battle, 1911 
With further reorganizations of the Ottoman Army, to include the creation of corps level headquarters, by 1911 the I Corps was headquartered in Harbiye. The Corps before the First Balkan War in 1911 was structured as such:

I Corps, Harbiye, Constantinople (Ferik Zeki Pasha)
1st Infantry Division, Harbiye, Constantinople
1st Infantry Regiment, Harbiye, Constantinople
2nd Infantry Regiment, Bakırköy, Constantinople
3rd Infantry Regiment, İşkodra
1st Rifle Battalion, Taksim, Constantinople
1st Field Artillery Regiment, Taksim, Constantinople
1st Division Band, Harbiye, Constantinople
2nd Infantry Division, Selimiye, Constantinople (Mirliva Prens Aziz Pasha)
4th Infantry Regiment, İşkodra
5th Infantry Regiment, Selimiye, Constantinople
6th Infantry Regiment, Selimiye, Constantinople
2nd Rifle Battalion, Selimiye, Constantinople
2nd Field Artillery Regiment, Selimiye, Constantinople
2nd Division Band, Selimiye, Constantinople
3rd Infantry Division, Pangaltı, Constantinople (Mirliva Osman Pasha)
7th Infantry Regiment, Taşkışla, Constantinople
8th Infantry Regiment, Taşkışla, Constantinople
9th Infantry Regiment, Kağıthane, Constantinople
3rd Rifle Battalion, Tophane, Constantinople
3rd Field Artillery Regiment, Rami Kışlası, Constantinople
3rd Division Band, Taşkışla, Constantinople
Units of I Corps
1st Rifle Regiment, Yıldız, Constantinople
1st Cavalry Brigade, Davutpaşa, Constantinople
1st Cavalry Regiment, Yıldız, Constantinople
2nd Cavalry Regiment, Davutpaşa, Constantinople
2nd Cavalry Brigade, Davutpaşa, Constantinople
3rd Cavalry Regiment, Davutpaşa, Constantinople
4th Cavalry Regiment, Selimiye, Constantinople
1st Horse Artillery Battalion, Davutpaşa, Constantinople
1st Mountain Artillery Battalion, Münzevî Kışlası, Constantinople
1st Field Howitzer Battalion, Gümüşsuyu, Constantinople
1st Engineer Battalion, İplikhane, Constantinople
1st Telegraph Battalion, Ertuğrul Kışlası, Constantinople
1st Medical Battalion, Ahırkapı, Constantinople
1st Railroad Battalion, Ahırkapı, Constantinople
2nd Railroad Battalion, Ahırkapı, Constantinople
War Academy, Harbiye, Constantinople
Cavalry Squadron, Harbiye, Constantinople
Infantry Company, Harbiye, Constantinople
Provisional Companies x 2, Harbiye, Constantinople
Machine-gun Company, Harbiye, Constantinople
Bosporus Fortified Area Command, Bosporus, Constantinople
1st Heavy Artillery Regiment, Bosporus, Constantinople
2nd Heavy Artillery Regiment, Bosporus, Constantinople
Searchlight Detachment, Bosporus, Constantinople
Torpedo Detachment, Bosporus, Constantinople
Mine Detachment, Bosporus, Constantinople
Wireless Detachment, Bosporus, Constantinople

Balkan Wars

Order of Battle, October 17, 1912 
On October 17, 1912, the corps was structured as follows:

I Corps (Thrace, under the command of the Eastern Army)
2nd Division, 3rd Division
1st Provisional Division

Order of Battle, October 29, 1912 
On October 29, 1912, the corps was structured as follows:

I Corps (Thrace, under the command of the First Eastern Army)
2nd Division, 3rd Division
1st Provisional Division, Uşak Redif Division

Order of Battle, November 17, 1912 
On November 17, 1912, the corps was structured as follows:

I Corps (Thrace, under the command of the Chataldja Army)
2nd Division, 3rd Division
South Wing Detachment
I Provisional Reserve Corps
29th Division
Ergli Redif Division, Kayseri Redif Division

Order of Battle, March 25, 1913 
On March 25, 1913, the corps was structured as follows:

I Corps (Thrace, under the command of the Chataldja Army)
2nd Division
Fatih Redif Division
I Provisional Reserve Corps
29th Division,
Ergli Redif Division, Kayseri Redif Division

Order of Battle, July 1913 
I Corps (Thrace)
2nd Division, 28th Division, Fatih Infantry Division

World War I

Order of Battle, August 1914, November 1914 
In August 1914, November 1914, the corps was structured as follows:

I Corps (Thrace)
1st Division, 2nd Division, 3rd Division

Order of Battle, Late April 1915 
In late April 1915, the corps was structured as follows:

I Corps (Thrace)
1st Division, 2nd Division

Order of Battle, Late Summer 1915, January 1916 
In late Summer 1915, January 1916, the corps was structured as follows:

I Corps (Gallipoli)
2nd Division, 3rd Division

Order of Battle, August 1916 
In August 1916, the corps was structured as follows:

I Corps (Gallipoli)
14th Division, 16th Division

Order of Battle, December 1916 
In December 1916, the corps was structured as follows:

I Corps (Thrace)
14th Division, 16th Division

Order of Battle, August 1917, January 1918, June 1918, September 1918 
In August 1917, January 1918, June 1918, September 1918, the corps was structured as follows:

I Corps (Thrace)
42nd Division

After Mudros

Order of Battle, November 1918 
In November 1918, the corps was structured as follows:

I Corps (Thrace)
55th Division

Order of Battle, January 1919 
In January 1919, the corps was structured as follows:

I Corps (Thrace, Adrianople; present day Edirne)
49th Division (Kırkkilise; present day Kırklareli)
153rd Infantry Regiment, 154th Infantry Regiment, 155th Infantry Regiment, 185th Infantry Regiment
60th Division (Malkara)
186th Infantry Regiment, 187th Infantry Regiment

Sources

Corps of the Ottoman Empire
Military units and formations of the Ottoman Empire in the Balkan Wars
Military units and formations of the Ottoman Empire in World War I
Military in Istanbul
1911 establishments in the Ottoman Empire